Lars Erik Frederiksen (born Lars Erik Dapello, August 30, 1971) is an American musician and record producer best known as a guitarist and vocalist for the punk rock band Rancid, as well as the frontman of Lars Frederiksen and the Bastards and the Old Firm Casuals. In addition, he currently plays guitar in Oxley's Midnight Runners, Stomper 98, and The Last Resort. He was also briefly a member of the UK Subs in 1991. 

Frederiksen joined Rancid in 1993 after the band was searching for a second guitar player and was present on their second album Let's Go. He has produced albums for bands such as Dropkick Murphys, Agnostic Front, The Business, Swingin Utters, Marky Ramone and the Intruders, Anti-Heros, Pressure Point, The Forgotten among others. He mixed GBH's 2010 album entitled Perfume and Piss, as well as Cock Sparrer's 2007 album "Here We Stand" both alongside Michael Rosen.

Personal life 
Frederiksen was raised by his mother, Minna Dapello (née Frederiksen), after his father John left at age three. Minna Dapello was a Danish immigrant who was the only member of her family to survive the Nazi occupation of Denmark, but witnessed their murder.

Frederiksen married his girlfriend Megan in 1998. They divorced, and he married San Francisco yoga instructor Stephanie Snyder with whom had two children together, both boys. In May 2020 Stephanie divorced Frederiksen.

On the 75th episode of That One Time on Tour podcast that aired on October 15, 2019, Frederiksen confirmed that he and Snyder had ended their relationship. He also mentioned that he "always liked the idea of a big family," and that he "plans to have more kids at some point in [his] life" and would be open to adoption. On having more kids, Frederiksen added, "hopefully I can find someone again [whom] I can share that with."

Frederiksen's brother was Robert "Rob" Dapello, a writer for Zero Magazine and a fellow musician, who died in February 2001 from a fatal brain aneurysm. The song "Otherside" off Rancid's 2003 album Indestructible is dedicated to Rob's memory. They were raised in Campbell, California, a city bordering San Jose.

He supports Millwall Football Club, and often has the Millwall lion on his guitar. He is also a San Jose Earthquakes season ticket holder. In January 2014, Lars and The Old Firm Casuals wrote the new team anthem/theme song for the San Jose Earthquakes titled "Never Say Die". Lars called the team the "punkest" team in MLS.

Recently, Frederiksen had gotten involved with San Francisco's Project Homeless Connect, partnering with Tony Hawk to donate skateboards to teenagers in the family shelter.

"It was emotional," said Frederiksen, who says he was reminded of his mother's struggles as a single parent. "But I was thinking that when people donate toys, it is always the teenagers that get left out. That's when I got Tony Hawk on the phone."

Career
Frederiksen has expressed his personal dislike for signing to major record labels numerous times.

Kids come up to us all the time and say, "We're in a band and we're never going to sign to some major label. We're going to stay independent like you guys. You guys proved you don't need to sign some major label and all that bullshit [to be successful]." That's the most gratifying thing anyone can say to me or to any of us.

Frederiksen appears in several episodes of Tim Armstrong's Tim Timebomb's Rock n Roll Theater as Dante. Lars can also be seen in the documentary film, The Other F Word. Lars is a longtime fan of professional wrestling. He is friends with professional wrestler CM Punk, and featured in the WWE produced documentary CM Punk: Best in the World.

During an appearance on the Wrestling Perspective Podcast, Lars suggested to Ruby Riott she should use the ring name Ruby Soho and assured her that he could also have the song cleared legally for her to use as her entrance theme. The name change was confirmed via a post on Prange's Instagram account.

Discography

Rancid 
Frederiksen on guitar and vocals.
 Radio Radio Radio (1993)
 Let's Go (1994)
 ...And Out Come the Wolves (1995)
 Life Won't Wait (1998)
 Rancid (2000)
 BYO Split Series Volume III (2002)
 Indestructible (2003)
 B Sides and C Sides (2008)
 Let the Dominoes Fall (2009)
 Honor Is All We Know (2014)
 Trouble Maker (2017)

Lars Frederiksen and the Bastards 
Frederiksen on guitar and vocals.
 Lars Frederiksen and the Bastards (2001)
 Viking (2004)
 Switchblade (EP)(Rancid Records, 2006)

The Old Firm Casuals 
Frederiksen on guitar and vocals.
The Old Firm Casuals S/T (7-inch) (Oi! the Boat Records 2011)
We Want The Lions Share (7-inch) (Randale Records 2011)
The Last Resort / The Old Firm Casuals (Split Double 7-inch) (Oi! the Boat Records 2011)
Army of One (7-inch) (Oi! the Boat Records 2011)
Oi! This Is Streetpunk Vol. 1 (11" Various Artists Compilation) (Pirates Press Records 2011)
Them Against Us (Split 7-inch w/ Insane Dogs) (Randale Records 2012)
Hooligan Classics Vol. 1 (Split Double 7-inch w/ The Chosen Ones, On File, Control) (Randale Records 2012)
Stesso Sangue (Split 7-inch w/ Klasse Kriminale) (Randale Records 2012)
Oi! Rules...OK! (Split 7-inch w/ Evil Conduct) (Randale Records 2012)
Red White & Blue: Which One Are You? (Split Double 7-inch w/ Harrington Saints, Argy Bargy, Booze & Glory) (Pirates Press Records 2012)
Oi! Ain't Dead (Split CD/LP w/ Razorblade, The Corps, Booze & Glory) (Rebellion Records 2012)
Born Criminal (7-inch) (TKO Records 2012)
Respect Your Roots Worldwide (CD Various Artists Compilation) (Strength Records 2012)
United We Stand: The Front Lines of American Street Punk (2×LP Various Artists Compilation) (Durty Mick Records 2013)
Hooligan Classics Vol. 2 (Split double 7-inch w/ Stomper 98, Iron Cross, The Gonads, and The Resort Bootboys*) (Randale Records 2013) *Resort Bootboys are The Old Firm Casuals with Roi Pierce of Last Resort on vocals
The Old Firm Casuals/ The Headliners split EP (Split 7-inch) (UVPR Records 2013)
For The Love of it All... (Double LP compilation of all previous releases except first 7-inch) (Oi! the Boat Records/Randale Records 2013)
EP+1 (The band's first EP plus bonus track of Madball cover "Pride" on CD) (Rebellion Records 2013)
Yuletide Cheers & Oi! (Split X-Mas 7-inch w/ Evil Conduct) (Randale Records 2013)
Never Say Die (San Jose Earthquakes Anthem on blue 7-inch) (Volsung Records 2014)
Perry Boys b/w Watford Tuxedo (7-inch) (Oi! the Boat Records/Randale Records, 2014)
This Means War (Debut LP) (Oi! the Boat Records/Randale Records, 2014)
Oi! Ain't Dead Vol. 3 (Split 7-inch w/ Noi!se, Razorblade, Badlands) (Rebellion Records, 2014)
A Butcher's Banquet (7 song EP) (Oi The Boat/Randale Records, 2016)
Sheer Terror/Old Firm Casuals (Split 7-inch EP) (PitchforkNY Records, 2016)
Wartime Rock N Roll EP (12-inch etched vinyl/CD) (Rebellion Records, 2017)
Holger Danske (LP) (Demons Run Amok Entertainment/Pirates Press Records, 2019)

Oxley's Midnight Runners 
Frederiksen on guitar and backing vocals.
We Are Legion, 7-inch record (Oi! the Boat Records 2014)
Invasion, 7-inch record (Oi! the Boat Records 2015)
Combat, 7-inch record (Oi! the Boat Records 2015)
Conquest, 7-inch record (Oi! the Boat Records 2016)
"American Made" (Side B, Song 7), Oi! Ain't Dead Volume 5, various artists compilation LP, (Rebellion Records 2016)
Furies, 7-inch record (Crowd Control Media/Randale Records 2018)

Stomper 98 
Frederiksen on guitar and backing vocals.

- Althergebracht LP (Contra Records 2018)

Tim Timebomb and Friends 
Frederiksen on guitar and vocals.
Tim Timebomb and Friends (2012)

As a producer 
...And Out Come the Wolves (1995) by Rancid (co-produced)
The Streets of San Francisco (1995) by Swingin' Utters
 The Truth, The Whole Truth And Nothing But The Truth (1997) by The Business
East Los Presents (1997) by Union 13
Class Separation (1997) by The Forgotten
Pandemonium (1997) by Powerhouse
No Regrets (1997) by Powerhouse
Life Won't Wait (1998) by Rancid (co-produced)
The Spidey Sessions 1995 (1998) by Redemption 87
All Guns Poolside! (1998) by Redemption 87
Do or Die (1998) by Dropkick Murphys
Youth on the Street (1998) by Pressure Point
Veni Vidi Vici (1998) by The Forgotten
The Gang's All Here (1999) by Dropkick Murphys
Riot, Riot, Upstart (1999) by Agnostic Front
Cross to Bear (1999) by Pressure Point
Underneath the Underground (1999) by Anti-Heros
The Answer to Your Problems? (1999) by Marky Ramone and the Intruders
We the People (2000) by Patriot
Hellbound and Heartless (2006) by The Heart Attacks
The Forgotten (2008) by The Forgotten
Pride & Tradition (2012) by Harrington Saints

References

Notes 
 Davies, Mike. "The Lock Up", BBC. Audio interview with Lars Frederiksen, requires RealPlayer. (February 16, 2005)
 Cummins, Johnson. "Lars Frederiksen takes stock of his hard knocks", The Montreal Mirror. (December 2, 2004)
 Ashare, Matt "Pretty in punk: Rancid's Lars Frederiksen steps forward", The Boston Phoenix. (March 15–22, 2001)

External links 

 Rancid's official website
 

1971 births
Living people
Singers from California
People from Campbell, California
American male singers
American people of Danish descent
American people of Italian descent
American punk rock guitarists
American punk rock singers
Rancid (band) members
Guitarists from California
American male guitarists
21st-century American singers
Lars Frederiksen and the Bastards members